Angus Robert Charles Fraser  (born 8 August 1965) is an English cricket administrator.

He served as the managing director of Middlesex Cricket between 2009 and 2021, before assuming a new role heading the club's academy. 

He is also a former English cricketer, journalist and England selector.

Fraser played in forty-six Test matches and forty-two One Day Internationals for England. Cricket commentator Colin Bateman commented that Fraser was "a reliable, intelligent and hard-working bowler".

Early life
Born in Billinge Higher End, Lancashire, Fraser was educated at the Gayton High School in Harrow, London and Orange Hill High School, Edgware, Greater London.

Cricket career
Fraser began his career with Middlesex in 1984, helping them to win the County Championship in 1985, 1990 and 1993. He also helped Middlesex to win the 1988 NatWest Trophy, taking 3–36 in the final, and the 1990 Refuge Assurance Cup.

He made his Test match debut with England in 1989 against Australia. In his fourth Test in 1990 he took his first five-wicket haul in Tests, in the process helping England to their first Test victory over the West Indies for sixteen years and 30 Tests. However England missed his contributions when he was forced to withdraw from this series with injury, as was the case during the Ashes series the following winter. A hip injury then kept him out of Test cricket for two and a half years, but he made an immediate impact on his return at the Oval in 1993, taking eight wickets as England recorded their first Test victory over Australia for 18 Tests and six and a half years.
 
Perhaps his finest hour came in the Barbados Test match of the 1993/94 West Indies tour when Fraser took 8–75 in the first innings to help set up a famous victory, West Indies' first defeat at Bridgetown for over half a century. His career-best first-class cricket innings bowling figures of 8–53 were taken in a Test match and against the same opposition, this time at Port of Spain, Trinidad and Tobago, in 1997/98. Despite taking eight wickets in that innings, and Test career best match figures of 11–110, he was not named Man of the Match which was awarded to Carl Hooper, from the victorious West Indies side. In all, Fraser toured the West Indies three times, and as of 2022, he has taken more Test wickets in the West Indies than any other visiting bowler.

His one-day international highest score of 38 not out was made late in the innings at number 10, which included a massive six off Steve Waugh and almost brought England back from the brink of defeat against Australia during the 1990/91 tour (Australia won by three runs). Another fine moment with the bat was in a last-wicket second-innings stand with Robert Croft to save the Third Test at Old Trafford against South Africa in 1998. According to the recollection of then England coach David Lloyd, as Fraser went out to face the bowling of Allan Donald, Fraser said :"‘The only way he'll get me out is if he knocks me through all three [stumps].’ I said: 'He probably will, Gus, but good luck'. But he survived. A red-inker it was and in retrospect one of the most important innings of the series".
 Fraser's short innings indeed helped to reverse the momentum in the series, Fraser taking three fivefers in the next two Tests to help England to an unlikely series victory. He also toured New Zealand and South Africa, and played in one-day tournaments in Asia, representing England. Throughout his career he used a bat nicknamed the "Gussy Hitter", the blade of which was designed by his mother.

Fraser last played for England during the 1999 Cricket world cup. Although born in Lancashire, Fraser played all of his county cricket for Middlesex in a first-class career lasting until 2002; he served as county captain from 2001 until his retirement in 2002.

After that, he worked as the cricket correspondent of The Independent newspaper (2002–2009), until his appointment to the newly created role of managing director of Cricket by Middlesex County Cricket Club in January 2009. He is a regular contributor to the BBC's Test Match Special and a cricket pundit for Sky Sports.

In the 1996 edition of Wisden, Fraser was one of the Wisden Cricketers of the Year.

Fraser served as the managing  director of cricket at Middlesex County Cricket Club between 2009 and 2021. He assumed a new role in heading the club's academy in July 2021. 

He also served as a selector for the England cricket team for a period after 2014.

Personal life

He now resides in Pinner with his wife Denise and two children, Alex and Bethan. In 2008, in his first managerial role, Fraser secured the U15 Middlesex Schools Association County Cup with The John Lyon School, where his son was in the squad.

Fraser is a fan of, and regular visitor to, Wealdstone Football Club.

References

External links

Debrett's People of Today

1965 births
Living people
English cricket administrators
English cricket coaches
English cricket commentators
English cricketers
English cricketers of 1969 to 2000
English male journalists
England One Day International cricketers
England Test cricketers
Managing Directors of Cricket
Members of the Order of the British Empire
Middlesex cricket captains
Marylebone Cricket Club cricketers
People educated at Harrow High School
People from Higher End
Wellington cricketers
Wisden Cricketers of the Year
Cricketers at the 1999 Cricket World Cup
Middlesex cricketers